Hanna Elżbieta Mierzejewska (21 May 1950 in Warsaw – 1 September 2015 in Brzeziny) was a Polish politician and a member of Law and Justice party. She was elected to Sejm on 25 September 2005, representing a Warsaw constituency.

References

External links
 Sejm official profile

1950 births
2015 deaths
Politicians from Warsaw
Law and Justice politicians
University of Warsaw alumni